The 2007 Laurence Olivier Awards were held in 2007 in London celebrating excellence in West End theatre by the Society of London Theatre.

Winners and nominees
Details of winners (in bold) and nominees, in each award category, per the Society of London Theatre.
{| class=wikitable width="100%"
|-
! width="50%" | Best New Play
! width="50%" | Best New Musical
|-
| valign="top" |
 Blackbird by David Harrower – Albery Frost/Nixon by Peter Morgan – Donmar Warehouse / Gielgud
 Rock 'n' Roll by Tom Stoppard – Royal Court / Duke of York's
 The Seafarer by Conor McPherson – National Theatre Cottesloe
| valign="top" |
 Caroline, or Change – National Theatre Lyttelton Avenue Q – Noël Coward
 Porgy and Bess – Savoy
 Spamalot – Palace
|-
! width="50%" | Best Revival
! width="50%" | Outstanding Musical Production
|-
| valign="top" |
 The Crucible – Gielgud A Moon for the Misbegotten – Old Vic
 Donkeys' Years – Comedy
 Who's Afraid of Virginia Woolf – Apollo
| valign="top" |
 Sunday in the Park with George – Wyndham's Cabaret – Lyric
 Evita – Adelphi
 The Sound of Music – London Palladium
|-
! colspan=1 | Best New Comedy
|-
|
 The 39 Steps by John Buchan, adapted by Patrick Barlow – Criterion Don Juan in Soho by Patrick Marber – Donmar Warehouse
 Love Song by John Kolvenbach – New Ambassadors
|-
! width="50%" | Best Actor
! width="50%" | Best Actress
|-
| valign="top" |
 Rufus Sewell as Jan in Rock 'n' Roll – Royal Court / Duke of York's Iain Glen as John Proctor in The Crucible – Gielgud
 David Haig as Christopher Headingley in Donkeys' Years – Comedy
 Frank Langella as Richard Nixon in Frost/Nixon – Donmar Warehouse / Gielgud
 Michael Sheen as David Frost in Frost/Nixon – Donmar Warehouse / Gielgud
| valign="top" |
 Tamsin Greig as Beatrice in Much ado about Nothing – Novello Eve Best as Josie in A Moon for the Misbegotten – Old Vic
 Sinéad Cusack as Eleanor and Esme in Rock 'n' Roll – Royal Court / Duke of York's
 Kathleen Turner as Martha in Who's Afraid of Virginia Woolf – Apollo
|-
! width="50%" | Best Actor in a Musical
! width="50%" | Best Actress in a Musical
|-
| valign="top" |
 Daniel Evans as Georges Seurat and George in Sunday in the Park with George – Wyndham's Tim Curry as King Arthur in Spamalot – Palace
 Clarke Peters as Porgy in Porgy and Bess – Savoy
 Philip Quast as Juan Perón in Evita – Adelphi
| valign="top" |
 Jenna Russell as Dot and Marie in Sunday in the Park with George – Wyndham's Nicola Hughes as Bess in Porgy and Bess – Savoy
 Tonya Pinkins as Caroline Thibodeaux in Caroline, or Change – National Theatre Lyttelton
 Elena Roger as Eva Perón in Evita – Adelphi
 Hannah Waddingham as the Lady of the Lake in Spamalot – Palace
|-
! width="50%" | Best Performance in a Supporting Role
! width="50%" | Best Performance in a Supporting Role in a Musical
|-
| valign="top" |
 Jim Norton as Richard Harkin in The Seafarer – National Theatre Cottesloe Samantha Bond as Rosemary in Donkeys' Years – Comedy
 Deborah Findlay as Susan in The Cut – Donmar Warehouse
 Mark Hadfield as Grivet in Thérèse Raquin – National Theatre Lyttelton
 Colm Meaney as Phil in A Moon for the Misbegotten – Old Vic
| valign="top" |
 Sheila Hancock as Frau Schneider in Cabaret – Lyric Anna Francolini as Rose Stopnick Gellman in Caroline, or Change – National Theatre Lyttelton
 Tom Goodman-Hill as Sir Lancelot in Spamalot – Palace
 Summer Strallen as Maisie in The Boy Friend – Regent's Park Open Air
|-
! width="50%" | Best Director
! width="50%" | Best Theatre Choreographer
|-
| valign="top" |
 Dominic Cooke for The Crucible – Gielgud Sam Buntrock for Sunday in the Park with George – Wyndham's
 Joe Mantello for Wicked – Apollo Victoria
| valign="top" |
 Javier de Frutos for Cabaret – Lyric Rob Ashford for Evita – Adelphi
 Bill Deamer for The Boy Friend – Regent's Park Open Air
 Stephen Mear for Sinatra – London Palladium
|-
! width="50%" | Best Set Design
! width="50%" | Best Costume Design
|-
| valign="top" |
 Timothy Bird and David Farley for Sunday in the Park with George – Wyndham's Tim Hatley for Spamalot – Palace
 Eugene Lee for Wicked – Apollo Victoria
| valign="top" |
 Alison Chitty for The Voysey Inheritance – National Theatre Lyttelton Tim Hatley for Spamalot – Palace
 Susan Hilferty for Wicked – Apollo Victoria
|-
! width="50%" | Best Lighting Design
! width="50%" | Best Sound Design
|-
| valign="top" |
 Natasha Chivers and Mike Robertson for Sunday in the Park with George – Wyndham's Neil Austin for Thérèse Raquin – National Theatre Lyttelton
 Jean Kalman for The Crucible – Gielgud
 Kenneth Posner for Wicked – Apollo Victoria
 Hugh Vanstone for Spamalot – Palace
| valign="top" |
 Gareth Fry for Waves – National Theatre Cottesloe Mic Pool for The 39 Steps – Criterion
 Ian Dickinson for Rock 'n' Roll – Royal Court / Duke of York's
|-
! width="50%" | Outstanding Achievement in Dance
! width="50%" | Best New Dance Production
|-
| valign="top" |
 Carlos Acosta in Carlos Acosta, Cuban National Ballet – Sadler's Wells Wayne McGregor for choreographing Chroma, The Royal Ballet – Royal Opera House
 Steven McRae in Chroma and Homage to the Queen, The Royal Ballet – Royal Opera House
 Marianela Núñez in DGV: Danse à Grande Vitesse and The Sleeping Beauty, The Royal Ballet  – Royal Opera House and Carlos Acosta, Cuban National Ballet – Sadler's Wells
| valign="top" |
 Chroma, The Royal Ballet – Royal Opera House
 DGV: Danse à Grande Vitesse, The Royal Ballet – Royal Opera House
 Fuji Musume and Kasane – Sadler's Wells
 The Sleeping Beauty, The Royal Ballet  – Royal Opera House
|-
! width="50%" | Outstanding Achievement in Opera
! width="50%" | Outstanding New Opera Production
|-
| valign="top" |
 Amanda Roocroft in Jenůfa, English National Opera – London Coliseum
 John Mark Ainsley in Orfeo, English National Opera – London Coliseum
 Joyce DiDonato in Hercules, Les Arts Florissants – Barbican
 John Tomlinson in Götterdämmerung, The Royal Opera – Royal Opera House
| valign="top" |
 Jenůfa, English National Opera – London Coliseum Orfeo, English National Opera – London Coliseum
 Peter Grimes, Opera North – Sadler's Wells
 The Makropoulos Case, English National Opera – London Coliseum
|-
! colspan=1 | Outstanding Achievement in an Affiliate Theatre
|-
|
 Pied Piper – Theatre Royal Stratford East Roy Dotrice in The Best of Friends – Hampstead
 Love and Money – Maria, Young Vic
 Theatre Royal Stratford East for a powerful season of provocative work, reaching new audiences
|-
! colspan=1 | Society Special Award
|-
|
 John Tomlinson'|}

Productions with multiple nominations and awards
The following 22 productions, including four ballets and two operas,  received multiple nominations:

 7: Spamalot 6: Sunday in the Park with George 4: Evita, The Crucible and Wicked 3: A Moon for the Misbegotten, Cabaret, Caroline, or Change, Chroma, Donkeys' Years, Frost/Nixon and Porgy and Bess 2: Carlos Acosta, DGV: Danse à Grande Vitesse, Jenůfa, Orfeo, The 39 Steps, The Boy Friend, The Seafarer, The Sleeping Beauty, Thérèse Raquin and Who's Afraid of Virginia WoolfThe following four productions, including one opera, received multiple awards:

 5: Sunday in the Park with George 2: Cabaret, Jenůfa and The Crucible''

See also
 61st Tony Awards

References

External links
 Previous Olivier Winners – 2007

Laurence Olivier Awards ceremonies
Laurence Olivier Awards
Laurence Olivier Awards
Laurence Olivier Awards
Laurence Olivier Awards